S.C. Centro Giovani Calciatori Viareggio Associazione Sportiva Dilettantistica, or simply C.G.C. Viareggio, is a multi-sport team from Viareggio, Italy. It was founded on 20 November 1947. The club consists of roller hockey section and football section, etc. It is the organiser of Torneo di Viareggio.

Honours
Lega Nazionale Hockey: 1
 2010–11
Coppa Italia: 1
 2010–11

External links
 

Roller hockey clubs in Italy
Multi-sport clubs in Italy
Sport in Viareggio
Torneo di Viareggio